Ancient Discoveries is a television series that premiered on December 21, 2003, on The History Channel. The program focused on ancient technologies.  The show's theme was that many inventions which are thought to be modern have ancient roots or in some cases may have been lost and then reinvented.  The program was a follow-up to a special originally broadcast in 2005 which focused on technologies from the Ancient Roman era such as the Antikythera mechanism and inventors such as Heron of Alexandria.  Episodes of the regular series expanded to cover other areas such as Egypt, China and East Asia, and the Islamic world.

Ancient Discoveries was made for The History Channel by Wild Dream Films based in Cardiff in the UK. Much of the filming was on location across the world. The series used contributions from archaeologists and other experts, footage of historical sites and artifacts, computer generated reconstructions, and dramatized reconstructions along with experiments and tests on reconstructed artifacts.

Episodes

Series 1 (2003)
Michael Carroll was the initial narrator of the series for The History Channel (US).

Series 2 (2005)
Phil Crowley was narrator of this series of episodes and for all subsequent episodes for  The History Channel (US).

Series 3 (2007)
This was the first series of episodes presented in wide screen format on The History Channel (US).

Series 4 (early 2008)

Series 5 (late 2008)

Series 6 (2009)

An episode about ancient surgery is available through Comcast OnDemand, even though it has not aired on History.

References

External links 
 Official Site (History Channel)
 Official Site of Wild Dream Films
  (Incomplete Episode Listings)
 Ancient Discoveries on Zap2It (Most Complete Episode Listings)

See also
 Ancient Inventions
 The Re-Inventors

History (American TV channel) original programming
2003 American television series debuts
2009 American television series endings